Lamaze International, formerly the American Society for Psychoprophylaxis in Obstetrics or ASPO, is an organization dedicated to promoting the Lamaze technique of natural childbirth. It was co-founded in 1960 by Elisabeth Bing and Marjorie Karmel.

References

External links
 

International medical and health organizations
Natural childbirth organizations
Non-profit organizations based in Washington, D.C.
Organizations established in 1960